The 1976 Western Michigan Broncos football team represented Western Michigan University in the Mid-American Conference (MAC) during the 1976 NCAA Division I football season.  In their second season under head coach Elliot Uzelac, the Broncos compiled a 7–4 record (6–3 against MAC opponents), finished in fourth place in the MAC, and outscored their opponents, 270 to 202.  The team played its home games at Waldo Stadium in Kalamazoo, Michigan.

The team's statistical leaders included Pepper Powers with 571 passing yards, Jerome Persell with 1,505 rushing yards, and Tom Henry with 225 receiving yards. Defensive back Dave Gapinski and quarterback Pepper Powers were the team captains. Tailback Jerome Persell received the team's most outstanding player award.

Persell was also named MAC offensive player of the year for the first of what would be three consecutive years. Elliot Uzelac was named the MAC coach of the year.

Schedule

References

Western Michigan
Western Michigan Broncos football seasons
Western Michigan Broncos football